John Farrell (born 1961) is an Irish retired hurler who played as a goalkeeper for the Tipperary senior team.

Born in Dundrum, County Tipperary, Farrell first arrived on the inter-county scene at the age of seventeen when he first linked up with the Tipperary minor team before later joining the under-21 side. He made his senior debut during the 1982 championship. Farrell went on to enjoy a brief career.

At club level Farrell won numerous divisional championship medals as a hurler and a Gaelic footballer with Knockavilla–Donaskeigh Kickhams.

Throughout his career Farrell made 1 championship appearance for Tipperary. His retirement came following the conclusion of the 1984 championship.

Honours

Player

Tipperary
All-Ireland Under-21 Hurling Championship (1): 1981
Munster Under-21 Hurling Championship (1): 1981

References

1961 births
Living people
Knockavilla-Donaskeigh Kickhams hurlers
Knockavilla-Donaskeigh Kickhams Gaelic footballers
Tipperary inter-county hurlers
Hurling goalkeepers